The Singapore International Foundation (SIF;) is a not-for-profit organisation established on 1 August 1991.

Arts for Good 
Arts and culture can aid sustainable development, particularly in fostering inclusive societies and promoting sustainable urban living.

The Arts for Good initiative enables collaborations between Singaporean artists and their international counterparts to promote awareness of social issues and share best practices, as well as galvanise greater community involvement to effect positive change.

Friendship Express 

Fifty Asian youths of eight nationalities – Burmese, Chinese, Indian, Indonesian, Filipino, Malaysian, Singaporean and Thai – participated in the Singapore International Foundation's inaugural Friendship Express programme for bridging communities from 11 to 23 June 2012.

Young Social Entrepreneurs 

The Young Social Entrepreneurs Programme is designed to help participants learn the fundamentals of starting a social enterprise. During the programme, participants work on refining business plans while becoming exposed to numerous social enterprises via specially arranged field trips. The programme encourages participants to share knowledge & experience in the areas of business plan development, enterprise structure, social impact assessment and fundraising.

Young Business Ambassadors 

The Young Business Ambassadors (YBA) Programme was first mooted at the second meeting of the Singapore-Australia Joint Ministerial Committee in Singapore on 22 February 1999.

Apart from creating opportunities for young professionals to interact, network and share vocational experiences, the programme started with the aim of promoting strategic trade and investment opportunities between Singapore, China and Australia.

The Singapore-Australia YBA Programme was inaugurated in March 2000 with Australian partner Asialink Centre. As SIF's first YBA programme, the new initiative was endorsed by private and public sectors in Singapore and Australia.

The Singapore-Chinese YBA programme was inaugurated in 2004, when a Memorandum of Understanding was signed between SIF, the Shanghai Municipal Office for the Introduction of Foreign Experts and the Shanghai People's Association for Friendship with Foreign Countries. The first batch of 23 Singapore-China YBAs started their 10-week stint in both countries in June 2004.

Visits 

SIF promotes people-to-people links between Singaporeans and the world.  We give our friends a better understanding of who we are, what we believe in and how we live through visits, exchanges, and cultural diplomacy programmes, such as the SIF Distinguished Visitors Programme, the Eminent Southeast Asians Programme, Temasek Programme, and the Singapore Encore series.

Through these platforms and activities, we share with the world community Singapore's culture and way of life.

Past Programmes

Singapore Executive Expeditions 
The Singapore Executive Expeditions (SXX) formed in 2005, is expressly designed to provide cross-cultural exposure to executives within the framework of an overseas expedition. Expeditions are held in environments of selected locations to give first-hand appreciation of the cultural heritage, political and social realities and the challenges of international development work.

SXX courses are designed to strengthen participants’ capacity to lead in diverse cultural environments, develop trustworthy relationships, and become world-ready executives with a sense of global citizenship.

Youth Expedition Project 
The Youth Expedition Project (YEP) was an initiative pioneered by SIF that took thousands of young Singaporeans on community service expeditions to China, India, and the ASEAN nations between 2000 and 2005.

Launched in 2000 by then Deputy Prime Minister Lee Hsien Loong, the vision behind YEP was for Singapore youths to become active and responsible world citizens, and to inspire them through meaningful overseas community service to make a difference to the lives of others, at home and abroad.

YEP at SIF concluded on 31 October 2005. The project is now under the purview of the National Youth Council. In its final year, SIF sent 48 teams of 14 young people each to aid Sri Lanka in recovering from the 2004 tsunami crisis.

See also 
Japan Foundation
Korea Foundation
Koyamada International Foundation
SHMZ

References

External links 
Singapore International Foundation Homepage

Foundations based in Singapore
1991 establishments in Singapore
Organizations established in 1991